The history of Uttar Pradesh the Northern Indian state, stretches back technically to its formation on 1 April 1937 as the North-Western Provinces of Agra and Awadh, but the region itself shows the presence of human habitation dating back to between 85,000 and 73,000 years ago. The region seems to have been domesticated as early as 6,000 BC.

The early modern period in the region started in 1526 after Babur invaded the Delhi Sultanate, and established the Mughal Empire covering large parts of modern Uttar Pradesh. The remnants of the Mughal Empire include their monuments, most notably Fatehpur Sikri, Allahabad Fort, Agra Fort, and the Taj Mahal.

The region was the site of the Indian Rebellion of 1857, with revolts at Meerut, Kanpur, and Lucknow. The region was also a site for the Indian Independence movement with the Indian National Congress.

After independence in 1947, the United Provinces were renamed Uttar Pradesh in 1950.

In 2000, the state of Uttarakhand was carved out from Uttar pradesh.

Prehistory
Archeological finds have indicated the presence of Stone Age Homo sapiens hunter-gatherers in Uttar Pradesh between around 85 and 73 thousand years old. Other pre-historical finds have included Middle and Upper Paleolithic artifacts dated to 21–31 thousand years old and Mesolithic/Microlithic hunter-gatherer's settlement, near Pratapgarh, from around 10550–9550 BC. Villages with domesticated cattle, sheep, and goats and evidence of agriculture began as early as 6000 BC, and gradually developed between c. 4000 and 2000 BC  beginning with the Indus Valley civilization and Harappa culture to the Vedic period; extending into the Iron Age.

The kingdom of Kosala, in the Mahajanapada era, was located within the regional boundaries of modern-day Uttar Pradesh. According to Hindu legend, the divine king Rama of the Ramayana epic reigned in Ayodhya, the capital of Kosala. Krishna, another divine king of Hindu legend, who plays a key role in the Mahabharata epic and is revered as the eighth reincarnation (Avatar) of the Hindu god Vishnu, is said to have been born in the city of Mathura, in Uttar Pradesh. The aftermath of the Mahabharata yuddh is believed to have taken place in the area between the Upper Doab and Delhi, (in what was Kuru Mahajanapada), during the reign of the Pandava king Yudhishthira. The kingdom of the Kurus corresponds to the Black and Red Ware and Painted Gray Ware culture and the beginning of the Iron Age in North-west India, around 1000 BC.

Middle Kingdoms (c. 200 BCE – 1206 CE) 
Most of the invaders of south India passed through the Gangetic plains of what is today Uttar Pradesh. Control over this region was of vital importance to the power and stability of all of India's major empires, including the Maurya (320–200 BC), Kushan (100–250 CE), Gupta (350–600 CE), and Gurjara-Pratihara (650–1036 CE) empires. Following the Huns invasions that broke the Gupta empire, the Ganges-Yamuna Doab saw the rise of Kannauj.

During the reign of Harshavardhana (590–647), the Kannauj empire reached its zenith. It spanned from Punjab in the north and Gujarat in the west to Bengal in the east and Odisha in the south. It included parts of central India, north of the Narmada River and it encompassed the entire Indo-Gangetic plain. Many communities in various parts of India claim descent from the migrants of Kannauj. Soon after Harshavardhana's death, his empire disintegrated into many kingdoms, which were invaded and ruled by the Gurjara-Pratihara empire, which challenged Bengal's Pala Empire for control of the region. Kannauj was several times invaded by the south Indian Rashtrakuta Dynasty from the 8th century to the 10th century.

Delhi Sultanate Era (1206 – 1526)

Parts or all of Uttar Pradesh were ruled by the Delhi Sultanate for 320 years (1206–1526). Five dynasties ruled over the Sultanate sequentially: the Mamluk dynasty (1206–90), the Khalji dynasty (1290–1320), the Tughlaq dynasty (1320–1414), the Sayyid dynasty (1414–51), and the Lodi dynasty (1451–1526).

Mughal Era (1526 – c. 1737) 

In the 16th century, Babur, a Timurid descendant of Timur and Genghis Khan from Fergana Valley (modern-day Uzbekistan), swept across the Khyber Pass and founded the Mughal Empire, covering India, along with modern-day Afghanistan, Pakistan and Bangladesh The Mughals were descended from Persianised Central Asian Turks (with significant Mongol admixture). In the Mughal era, Uttar Pradesh became the heartland of the empire. Mughal emperors Babur and Humayun ruled from Agra.

In 1540 an Afghan, Sher Shah Suri, took over the reins of Uttar Pradesh after defeating the Mughal king Humanyun. Sher Shah and his son Islam Shah ruled Uttar Pradesh from their capital at Gwalior. After the death of Islam Shah Suri, his prime minister Hemu became the de facto ruler of Uttar Pradesh, Bihar, Madhya Pradesh, and the western parts of Bengal. He was bestowed the title of Vikramaditya at his coronation in Purana Quila in Delhi. Hemu died in the Second Battle of Panipat, and Uttar Pradesh came under Emperor Akbar's rule. Akbar ruled from Agra and his newly established city, Fatehpur Sikri. He was succeeded by his son Jahangir.

Jahangir was succeeded by his son Shah Jahan. Shah Jahan is famous for building the Taj Mahal, a mausoleum for his queen Mumtaz Mahal. The Taj Mahal is considered one of the most significant examples of Indo-Islamic architecture. Shah Jahan was succeeded by his son Aurangzeb, who did not share the religious tolerance of his ancestors, and was infamous for the destruction of temples.

Maratha Era (c. 1737 – 1818)
In the 18th century, after the fall of Mughal authority, the power vacuum was filled by the Maratha Empire, in the mid 18th century, the Maratha army invaded the Uttar Pradesh region, which resulted in Rohillas losing control of Rohillkhand to the Maratha rulers Raghunath Rao and Malharao Holkar. The conflict between Rohillas and Marathas came to an end on 18December 1788 with the arrest of Ghulam Qadir, the grandson of Najeeb-ud-Daula, who was defeated by the Maratha general Mahadaji Scindia. In 1803, following the Second Anglo-Maratha War, when the British East India Company defeated the Maratha Empire, much of the region came under British suzerainty.

British Era (1818 – 1947)

Company Rule and Indian Rebellion of 1857 

Starting from Bengal in the second half of the 18th century, a series of battles for north Indian lands finally gave the British East India Company accession over the state's territories. Ajmer and Jaipur kingdoms were also included in this northern territory, which was named the "North-Western Provinces" (of Agra). Although UP later became the fifth largest state of India, NWPA was one of the smallest states of the British Indian empire. Its capital shifted twice between Agra and Allahabad.Due to dissatisfaction with British rule, a serious rebellion erupted in various parts of North India; Bengal regiment's sepoy stationed at Meerut cantonment, Mangal Pandey, is widely credited as its starting point. It came to be known as the Indian Rebellion of 1857.

Direct British rule (1858 – 1947) 

After the revolt failed, the British attempted to divide the most rebellious regions by reorganizing the administrative boundaries of the region, splitting the Delhi region from 'NWFP of Agra' and merging it with Punjab, while the Ajmer- Marwar region was merged with Rajputana and Oudh was incorporated into the state. The new state was called the 'North Western Provinces of Agra and Oudh', which in 1902 was renamed as the United Provinces of Agra and Oudh. It was commonly referred to as the United Provinces or its acronym UP.

In 1920, the capital of the province was shifted from Allahabad to Lucknow. The high court continued to be at Allahabad, but a bench was established at Lucknow. Allahabad continues to be an important administrative base of today's Uttar Pradesh and has several administrative headquarters. Uttar Pradesh continued to be central to Indian politics and was especially important in modern Indian history as a hotbed of the Indian independence movement. Uttar Pradesh hosted modern educational institutions such as the Benaras Hindu University, Aligarh Muslim University and the Darul Uloom Deoband. Nationally known figures such as Chandra Shekhar Azad were among the leaders of the movement in Uttar Pradesh, and Motilal Nehru, Jawaharlal Nehru, Madan Mohan Malaviya and Gobind Ballabh Pant were important national leaders of the Indian National Congress. The All India Kisan Sabha (AIKS) was formed at the Lucknow session of the Congress on 11 April 1936, with the famous nationalist Swami Sahajanand Saraswati elected as its first President, in order to address the longstanding grievances of the peasantry and mobilise them against the zamindari landlords attacks on their occupancy rights, thus sparking the Farmers movements in India. During the Quit India Movement of 1942, Ballia district overthrew the colonial authority and installed an independent administration under Chittu Pandey. Ballia became known as "Baghi Ballia" (Rebel Ballia) for this significant role in India's independence movement.

Post-Independence (1947 – present)

1950 – 2000 
After India's independence, the United Provinces were reorganized as Uttar Pradesh in 1950. The state has provided seven of India's prime ministers and is the source of the largest number of seats in the Lok Sabha. Despite its political influence, its poor economic development and administrative record, organised crime and corruption kept it amongst India's backward states. The state has been affected by repeated episodes of caste and communal violence.

There were incidents of communal violence in 1980 and 1987. 1992, a large group of Hindu activists demolished the 16th-century Babri Mosque in the city of Ayodhya, which is claimed to be the site of Ram Janmabhoomi. The Ayodhya dispute triggered massive protests across the state as well as nationally and internationally.

2000 – present 
In 2000, northern districts of the state were separated to form the state of Uttarakhand. In February 2017, Yogi Adityanath became the chief minister of Uttar Pradesh. In 2019, Ayodhya Dispute was settled by The Supreme Court of India. The ground-breaking ceremony of the Rama Janmabhoomi temple took place on 5 August 2020.

Uttar Pradesh has improved its performance considerably in the recent times witnessing lowest crime rate in 2020.

The state has also made strides on various economic parameters in the recent times, doubling its GSDP to Rs 21.73 lakh crore (2020–21) in four years from Rs 10.90 lakh crore in 2015-16. Under its Chief Minister Yogi Adityanath, the state also became the second most favourable destination in the country for doing business.

See also
 Indus Valley Tradition
 Painted Grey Ware
 Vedic science

References

Bibliography
For Paleolithic & Neolithic period:

For Copper Hoard culture:
Sharma, Deo Prakash, 2002. Newly Discovered Copper Hoard, Weapons of South Asia (C. 2800–1500 BC), Delhi, Bharatiya Kala Prakashan,182 p.
Yule, P. 1985. Metalwork of the Bronze Age in India. C.H. Beck, Munich 
Yule, P./Hauptmann, A./Hughes, M. 1989 [1992]. The Copper Hoards of the Indian Subcontinent: Preliminaries for an Interpretation, Jahrbuch des Römisch-Germanischen Zentralmuseums Mainz 36, 193–275, ISSN 0076-2741
Gupta, S.P. (ed.). 1995. The lost Sarasvati and the Indus Civilization. Kusumanjali Prakashan, Jodhpur.

For Painted Grey Ware culture:
 
Chakrabarti, D.K. 1968. The Aryan hypothesis in Indian archaeology. Indian Studies Past and Present 4, 333–358.
Jim Shaffer. 1984. The Indo-Aryan Invasions: Cultural Myth and Archaeological Reality. In: J.R. Lukak. The People of South Asia. New York: Plenum. 1984.
 Kennedy, Kenneth 1995. "Have Aryans been identified in the prehistoric skeletal record from South Asia?", in George Erdosy, ed.: The Indo-Aryans of Ancient South Asia, pp. 49–54.

For Cemetery H culture:

 http://www.harappa.com
 https://web.archive.org/web/20060908052731/http://pubweb.cc.u-tokai.ac.jp/indus/english/3_1_01.html

For Vedic Period:
 
 
 

For Indo-Schynthians
 Harmatta, János, ed., 1994. History of civilizations of Central Asia, Volume II. The development of sedentary and nomadic civilizations: 700 BC to AD 250.  Paris, UNESCO Publishing.
 Hill, John E. 2004. The Western Regions according to the Hou Hanshu. Draft annotated English translation.
 Hill, John E. 2004. The Peoples of the West from the Weilue 魏略 by Yu Huan 魚豢: A Third Century Chinese Account Composed between 239 and 265 AD. Draft annotated English translation. 
 Liu, Xinru 2001 "Migration and Settlement of the Yuezhi-Kushan: Interaction and Interdependence of Nomadic and Sedentary Societies." Journal of World History, Volume 12, No. 2, Fall 2001. University of Hawaii Press, pp. 261–292. .
 Watson, Burton. Trans. 1961. Records of the Grand Historian of China: Translated from the Shih chi of Ssu-ma Ch'ien. Chapter 123: The Account of Ta-yüan, p. 265. Columbia University Press. 

For Kushans:

Faccenna, Domenico (1980). Butkara I (Swāt, Pakistan) 1956–1962, Volume III 1 (in English). Rome: IsMEO (Istituto Italiano Per Il Medio Ed Estremo Oriente).
Falk, Harry. 1995–1996. Silk Road Art and Archaeology IV.
 Falk, Harry. 2001. Silk Road Art and Archaeology VII, pp. 121–136.
Falk, Harry. 2004. "The  era in Gupta records." Harry Falk. Silk Road Art and Archaeology X, pp. 167–176.
Goyal, S. R. "Ancient Indian Inscriptions" Kusumanjali Book World, Jodhpur (India), 2005.
 Hill, John E. 2004. The Western Regions according to the Hou Hanshu. Draft annotated English translation.
 Hill, John E. 2004. The Peoples of the West from the Weilue 魏略 by Yu Huan 魚豢: A Third Century Chinese Account Composed between 239 and 265 AD. Draft annotated English translation.

Further reading
R. C. Majumdar and A. D. Pusalker (editors): The History and Culture of the Indian People. Volume I, The Vedic age. Bombay : Bharatiya Vidya Bhavan 1951
 R.C. Majumdar et al. An Advanced History of India, MacMillan, 1967.
Lokmanya Bal Gangadhar Tilak "The Arctic Home in the Vedas", Messrs Tilak Bros., 1903